P123 is a copolymer.

P123 may also refer to:
 Jalan Tun Hamdan Sheikh Tahir, Penang state route P123
 Papyrus 123, a biblical manuscript
 Piaggio P.123, an Italian transport aircraft
 , a patrol boat of the Turkish Navy
 P123, a state regional road in Latvia

See also 
 R-123, a Soviet military radio